Gospođinci is a village in the municipality of Žabalj, in the South Bačka District of Serbia. It is situated in the Autonomous Province of Vojvodina. The village has a Serb ethnic majority and its population is 3,896 (2002 census).

Name

Its name derived from the Serbian word "gospođa" ("lady" in English). In Serbian, the village is known as Госпођинци or Gospođinci, in Croatian as Gospođinci, in Hungarian as Boldogasszonyfalva, and in German as Frauendorf. The name of the settlement in Serbian is plural.

Features

This is a typical Vojvodinian village with its inhabitants mostly working in agriculture or in the capital of Vojvodina, Novi Sad. Most of the village streets are straight from one end to another with houses built one next to the other. As it is typical with most of the villages in Vojvodina, the houses, most of which were built before the 1980s, have only one floor and a big attic. Also the majority of the properties are divided into "first" and "second" yards by small fences with gates, with gardens at the very back. First yards are, mostly, lawns, while second yards are used for barns, agricultural machine and equipment storage and, sometimes, poultry growing. Gardens are used for growing potatoes, tomatoes and other vegetables. Apple and peach trees, among others, are very common.

History

From the time of the Roman Empire just outside the village, on the west, lies the trench which Romans have used for transport. During the Ottoman rule (16th–17th centuries), the village of Gospođinci was populated by ethnic Serbs. During the Habsburg rule in the 18th and 19th century, the village belonged to the Military Frontier province (the Šajkaš Battalion section).

Since 1918, the village was part of the Kingdom of Serbs, Croats and Slovenes and subsequent South Slavic states. During the Hungarian Axis occupation, in a 1942 raid, 85 inhabitants of the village were murdered, of whom there were 47 men, 19 women, 15 children, and four old people. By nationality, the victims included 73 Serbs, 10 Jews, and two Rusyns.

Historical population
1948: 0
1953: 0
1961: 0
1971: 0
1981: 0
1991: 0
2002: 0
2011: 0
2013: 1

As the data from 1981 to 1991 shows, the village had greater mortality rate then natality, which was, and still is, the main problem in whole of Vojvodina, due to dropping of standard caused by the death of Josip Broz Tito, and the communists ideals, which led to escalating crisis in former SFR of Yugoslavia. However, the data from 1991 to 2002 shows population increase caused by the Serb refugees from Bosnia and Croatia who settled in the village during the Yugoslav wars.

See also
List of places in Serbia
List of cities, towns and villages in Vojvodina

References

Slobodan Ćurčić, Broj stanovnika Vojvodine, Novi Sad, 1996.
Zvonimir Golubović, Racija u južnoj Bačkoj 1942. godine, Novi Sad, 1991.
Dr Dušan J. Popović, Srbi u Vojvodini, knjiga 1, Novi Sad, 1990.

Places in Bačka
South Bačka District